From the Gecko is the debut album by Boston band The Slip.  It was released in 1997 on the band's KA Records label. (It is also the title of a different album by Daboa (aka Frank Harris) also released in 1997 on the Triple Earth label.)

The album features guest musicians Timo Shanko (tenor sax), Daisuke Fujiwara (soprano sax), and Gus Zeising (soprano sax) on selected tracks.

Track listing
"Munf" – 6:19
"Alsoa" – 6:25
"Yellow Medicine" – 8:45
"The Weight of Solomon" – 8:09
"Spice Groove" – 4:46
"Cumulus" – 8:01
"Eube" – 8:23
"Children of Atlantis" – 6:06
"Island of Peace" – 2:03
"Honey Melon" – 11:17
"Entering Saugus" – 3:44

All tracks credited to The Slip.

Personnel

Musical
Timo Shanko – tenor saxophone
Gus Ziesing – soprano saxophone
Daisuke Fujiwara – soprano saxophone
Andrew Barr - drums
Brad Barr - guitar, keyboards, vocals
Marc Freidman - bass

Technical
The Slip – producer, engineer 
Martin Guigui – producer 
Gus Ziesing - engineer
David Correia – engineer, mixing
Andy Hall – engineer, mixing 
Barrett Rogers – illustrations
Kim Wallace – illustrations
Jason Booth – layout design

References

External links

1997 debut albums
The Slip (band) albums